The Delaware Wizards were a professional  soccer club based in Wilmington and New Castle, Delaware. The team played their first game in 1993 and their last in 2000. They played in the USISL.  They were considered DC United's farm team but ended up folding due to financial issues and losing players to other clubs.  Many players went to MLS and other USL teams.

In 2007, David Whitcraft was inducted into the Delaware Sports Museum and Hall of Fame for his efforts as the first captain of the team.

In 2008, a reincarnation of the Delaware Wizards was formed playing amateur soccer. Led by a group of former fans and ball boys of the original Delaware Wizards, they have enjoyed modest success. As of 2009, they currently play in the New Castle County Soccer League.

Year-by-year

Current Squad

Defunct soccer clubs in Delaware
USL Second Division teams
Soccer clubs in Delaware
1993 establishments in Delaware
2000 disestablishments in Delaware
Association football clubs established in 1993
Association football clubs disestablished in 2000